Varieties of Disturbance is Lydia Davis's fourth collection of short stories. The book, published in 2007 by FSG, was a finalist for the National Book Awards for Fiction that year.

References

2007 short story collections
Farrar, Straus and Giroux books